"Dreams" is a song by the American alternative rock musician Beck, released on June 15, 2015. The song is the lead single and first release from his tenth album, Colors (2017). The song's music is upbeat and funky, in contrast to the more muted sound of his previous album, Morning Phase (2014), with Beck stating that he "was really trying to make something that would be good to play live."

"Dreams" was featured in the soundtrack of the EA Sports game FIFA 16 (2015). The song was heavily featured on Beats 1, Apple Music's flagship radio station, with 65 plays in July 2015.

Reception

Critical
Rolling Stone ranked "Dreams" at number 23 on its annual year-end list of the best songs of 2015. Billboard also ranked "Dreams" at number 23 on its year-end list for 2015.

Commercial
"Dreams" was Beck's highest charting single on Alternative radio since "E-Pro" topped the chart in 2005. However, it was blocked from the top spot by "Renegades" by X Ambassadors.

Charts

Weekly charts

Year-end charts

Release history

References

Songs about dreams
2015 singles
2015 songs
Beck songs
Capitol Records singles
Song recordings produced by Greg Kurstin
Songs written by Beck
Songs written by Greg Kurstin
Songs written by Andrew Wyatt